In cryptozoology, the Mokele-mbembe (also written as "Mokèlé-mbèmbé"), Lingala for "one who stops the flow of rivers", is a water-dwelling entity that supposedly lives in the Congo River Basin, sometimes described as a living creature, sometimes as a spirit. Those that have allegedly seen the creature describe it as a large quadrupedal herbivore with smooth skin, a long neck and a single tooth, sometimes said to be a horn.

In early to mid 20th century, the entity would become a point of focus among adherents of the pseudoscience of cryptozoology, and young Earth creationism, resulting in numerous expeditions led by cryptozoologists and funded by young Earth creationists and other groups with the objective to find evidence that invalidates or contradicts the scientific consensus regarding evolution. Paleontologist Donald Prothero remarks that "the quest for Mokele-Mbembe... is part of the effort by creationists to overthrow the theory of evolution and teaching of science by any means possible". Additionally, Prothero observes that "The only people looking for mokele-mbembe are creationist ministers, not wildlife biologists."

Historian Edward Guimont has argued that the mokele-mbembe myth grows out of earlier pseudohistorical claims about Great Zimbabwe, and in turn influenced the later reptilian conspiracy theory.

History

20th century
The first description of the mokele-mbembe as a sauropod-like beast was in 1909, in Beasts and Men, the autobiography of famed big-game hunter Carl Hagenbeck. He claimed to have heard from two independent sources about a creature living in Rhodesia, or modern day Zimbabwe, which was described to them by natives as "half elephant, half dragon." Naturalist Joseph Menges had also told Hagenbeck about similar stories. Hagenbeck speculated that "it can only be some kind of dinosaur, seemingly akin to the Brontosaurus." Another of Hagenbeck's sources, Hans Schomburgk, asserted that while at Lake Bangweulu, he noted a lack of hippopotami; his native guides informed him of a large hippo-killing creature that lived in Lake Bangweulu; however, as noted below, Schomburgk thought that native testimony was sometimes unreliable.

Tales of entities like mokele-mbembe, living saurians walking around the African rain forest, are not rare; there have been multiple tales of large, smooth-skinned quadrupeds with long necks that fed on large prey still living in central Africa. It was only after the description of the mokele-mbembe surfaced that the rest of the world started interpreting those legends as possessing a dinosaur-like body structure. A notable example would be the emela-ntouka, an elephant-sized creature that shares a lot of similarities with the mokele-mbembe. It is described as having smooth skin, a strong and muscular tail, and a "horn" or "tooth". Another similar creature, the jago-nini, was described by Alfred Aloysius Smith, who had worked for a British trading company in what is now Gabon in the late 1800s, who briefly mentions it in his 1927 memoir.

Reports of entities described to be dinosaur-like in Africa caused a minor sensation in the mass media, and newspapers in Europe and North America carried many articles on the subject in the early 1910s; some took the reports at face value, while others were more skeptical. It is notable that Western Europe and the Americas were going through a pop cultural interest in dinosaurs, of which the Brontosaurus was one of the most popular. This could have contributed to both the reports as well as the tendency for newspapers to claim the reported beast was a sauropod.

According to German adventurer Lt. Paul Gratz's account from 1911:The crocodile is found only in very isolated specimens in Lake Bangweulu, except in the mouths of the large rivers at the north. In the swamp lives the nsanga, much feared by the natives, a degenerate saurian which one might well confuse with the crocodile were it not that its skin has no scales and its toes are armed with claws. I did not succeed in shooting a nsanga, but on the island of Mbawala I came by some strips of its skin.

Another report comes from German Captain , as described by Willy Ley in the book The Lungfish and the Unicorn (1941). Von Stein was ordered to conduct a survey of German colonies in what is now Cameroon in 1913. He heard stories of an enormous reptile called "Mokele-mbembe" alleged to live in the jungles, and included a description in his official report. According to Ley, "von Stein worded his report with utmost caution," knowing it might be seen as unbelievable. Nonetheless, von Stein thought the tales were credible: trusted native guides had related the tales to him, and the stories were related to him by independent sources, yet featured many of the same details. Though von Stein's report was never formally published, Ley quoted von Stein as writing:

The animal is said to be of a brownish-gray color with a smooth skin, its size is approximately that of an elephant; at least that of a hippopotamus. It is said to have a long and very flexible neck and only one tooth but a very long one; some say it is a horn. A few spoke about a long, muscular tail like that of an alligator. Canoes coming near it are said to be doomed; the animal is said to attack the vessels at once and to kill the crews but without eating the bodies. The creature is said to live in the caves that have been washed out by the river in the clay of its shores at sharp bends. It is said to climb the shores even at daytime in search of food; its diet is said to be entirely vegetable. This feature disagrees with a possible explanation as a myth. The preferred plant was shown to me, it is a kind of liana with large white blossoms, with a milky sap and apple-like fruits. At the Ssombo River I was shown a path said to have been made by this animal in order to get at its food. The path was fresh and there were plants of the described type nearby. But since there were too many tracks of elephants, hippos, and other large mammals it was impossible to make out a particular spoor with any amount of certainty.

21st century
In 2001, BBC broadcast in the TV series Congo a collective interview with a group of Biaka pygmies, who identified the mokele-mbembe as a rhinoceros while looking at an illustrated manual of wildlife. Neither species of African rhinoceros is common in the Congo Basin, and the mokele-mbembe may be a mixture of mythology and folk memory from a time when rhinoceroses were found in the area.

In 2016, a travel documentary crew from South Africa made a documentary about searching for mokele-mbembe, which they later sold to Discovery Africa. The team spent roughly four weeks in the Likuoala swamp region visiting various Aka (pygmy) villages, collecting stories of the creature's existence. They point out the difficulty of differentiating between mokele-mbembe's metaphysical and physical existence. While they interviewed people who believed in its presence, others stated it died at least a decade ago.

In 2018, Lensgreve of Knuthenborg, Adam Christoffer Knuth, along with a film crew from Danish Radio and a DNA scientist, traveled to Lake Tele in Congo, in search of the mokele-mbembe. They did not find the dinosaur. However they found a new green algae.

Possible explanation
The mokele-mbembe's existence has been highly questioned since its publication: the lack of physical evidence and the conflicting witnesses have made the existence of the entity doubted by the astounding majority of scientists and historians. The most reasonable and agreed upon explanation is that the mokele-mbembe is a legend based on the black rhinoceros, a species once common to central Africa, where the stories of the mokele-mbembe originated. The absence of this evidence, despite several centuries of Western contact with the region, numerous expeditions in search of the animal, and periodic aerial and satellite surveillance, all of which have detected elephants and other large animals - but no sauropods - all argue against the existence of mokele-mbembe.

In popular culture 
 A rather disadvantageous line of the chess opening Alekhine's Defence is named after the creature: the "mokele-mbembe variation".
 The mokele-mbembe was featured in The Secret Files of the Spy Dogs episode "Earnest." It is among the creatures that have been caught by Earnest Anyway.
 In the 1985 film Baby: Secret of the Lost Legend, rumors of a sighting of mokele-mbembe lead the main characters to a family of live sauropods.
 In 1989 The Punisher/Wolverine African Saga (On the Track of Unknown Animals/Endangered Species, The Punisher War Journal #6-#7) by Carl Potts and Jim Lee, mentioned superheroes stops band of poachers who tried to hunt mokele-mbembe.
 In the 1994 video game Uncharted Waters: New Horizons, the mokele-mbembe can be discovered in the Congo River.
 In May 2013 the Norwegian experimental music outfit Sturle Dagsland released a song entitled "mokele-mbembe".
 The Roland Smith novel Cryptid Hunters revolves around a search for the mokele-mbembe and successful recovery of two of its eggs (the only known adult specimens having died beforehand) from the jungles of the Congo.
 Mokele-mbembe is one of six cryptids sought by comedian and journalist Dom Joly in his travel book Scary Monsters and Super Creeps.
 Korean American artist David Choe claimed on an episode of The Joe Rogan Experience that as a young man he travelled to the Congo in search of Mokele-mbembe after reading about it in a magazine while he was living in Israel.
 In the World of Darkness universe by White Wolf Publishing, the Mokole are a breed of were-reptiles who serve as the "memory" of Gaia.
 The 2019 film Godzilla: King of the Monsters mentions a Titan dubbed Mokele-mbembe, though it is not seen in the film. But the creature's figure was seen in its misty and foggy containment in Outpost 75 Jebel Barkal, Sudan while it arises and escapes after being awoken by King Ghidorah alongside the other 17 titans. The creature is featured more prominently in the film's novelization. 
 In the SCP Foundation, mokele-mbembe is what a village of Mbochi people call a specimen of SCP-1265, specifically a Camarasaurus. They also mention Mbielu-Mbielu-Mbielu also being a part of SCP-1265, with it being a Kentrosaurus.

See also 

 Mušḫuššu
 Cryptid
 Living dinosaur
 Loch Ness Monster
 Lariosauro
 Nahuelito

References

Bibliography & further reading
 
 
 

Central African legendary creatures
Cryptids
Living dinosaurs
Pygmy mythology
Young Earth creationism